Turning movement counters (TMC's) are devices used to manually quantify the movement of vehicles through an intersection. 

TMC's are square shaped boxes that have buttons for each direction of traffic flow. For example, east bound traffic entering an intersection has a button for those vehicles that turn, left, right or continue straight. Furthermore, an additional button is used for each direction to add the number of pedestrian and bicyclist movement. Typically automated traffic counters assess traffic flows, however, due to the differing angles of vehicles entering an intersection the present technology available is not able to quantify the traffic without major error. Traditional automated traffic counters have rubber tubes which are laid out across the road generally in a straight portion in order to have the wheels on the same axle hit at about the same time. When turning in an intersection the tires hit individually and the amount of error in the counter is increased.  This means that TMC's are the only present option for quantifying traffic flows. They are used manually by an individual pressing the correlating button for every vehicle that enters and moves through the intersection.  

TMC's are generally used to determine whether the intersection needs a traffic light. Equations are used to decide whether the volume of the traffic determines that a light is needed. This equation is based on the road classification, entering speed and pedestrian/bicyclist movement through the intersection. A total of eight hours of turning movement is generally mandated for this type of assessment.

References

Murthy, Narasimha & Henry R. Mohle. "Transportation Engineering Basics", ASCE Press

Road traffic management